Dorothy McGowan (sometimes credited as Dorothy MacGowan) was a Brooklyn, New York–born model and actress. 

A daughter of Irish immigrants Sarah ( Philbin) and Michael McGowan, and born in the Bay Ridge section of Brooklyn, she had one sister, Mary, and two brothers, Peter, a policeman who was ordained in 1966 as a Roman Catholic priest, and James, also a policeman, whose role as lead negotiator in a hostage crisis was dramatized in the film Dog Day Afternoon.

McGowan was one of photographer William Klein's favorite models. After the release of Who Are You, Polly Maggoo?, in which she starred, she disappeared from public life.

She was married to, and divorced from photographer Didier Dorot, with whom she had
two children. In 2022, she died at age 82 in  Mamaroneck, New York.

References

External links
 
 

1939 births
2022 deaths
People from Brooklyn
American film actresses
Actresses from New York City
Female models from New York (state)
People from Mamaroneck, New York
21st-century American women